The Kochi-Muziris Biennale 2018 was the fourth edition of the Kochi-Muziris Biennale, an international exhibition of contemporary art held in Kochi, Kerala. This edition which was curated by Anita Dube began on 12 December 2018 and ended on 29 March 2019. Like the previous editions, Aspinwall House, Pepper House, Kasi Art Cafe, Cabral Yard, David Hall are the main venues of this biennale. This biennale was inaugurated by the Chief Minister of Kerala, Pinarayi Vijayan. The Kochi-Muziris Biennale is an initiative of the Kochi Biennale Foundation with support from the Government of Kerala.

History
In May 2010, Mumbai based contemporary artists of Kerala origin, Bose Krishnamachari and Riyaz Komu, were approached by then culture minister of Kerala, M.A Baby to start an international art project in the state. After this, the Kochi Biennale Foundation was setup in the year 2010.

The First Kochi-Muziris Biennale began on 12 December 2012. The Biennale hosted 88 artists from 30 different countries, site-specific works and a sustained education programme in the three months. Kochi-Muziris Biennale was also conducted in the years 2014 and 2016.

Curatorial vision

Possibilities for a Non-Alienated Life is the title for the curatorial vision of the fourth edition of biennale.

Art room for children
An art room was opened for nurturing children's talent in art by the Kochi Biennale foundation as the part of the Art by Children project also conducted by KBF.

Biennale Guided Tours
Apart from the short guide and the wall text, the Kochi Biennale Foundation had also arranged free public tours and reserved guided walks in this fourth edition.

List of artists
94 projects by 138 artists from 32 countries were exhibited in this biennale.

See also
Kochi Muziris Biennale
Anita Dube

References

External links

Kochi-Muziris Biennale
Art exhibitions in India
Art biennials
Culture of Kochi